Novokatayevo (Yañı Qatay) is a rural locality (a selo) and the administrative center of Novokatayevsky Selsoviet, Bakalinsky District, Bashkortostan, Russia. The population was 425 in 2010. There are six streets.

Geography 
Novokatayevo is located 11 km east of Bakaly (the district's administrative centre) by road. Starokatayevo is the nearest rural locality.

References 

Rural localities in Bakalinsky District